Yuanga (Yuaga), or Nua, is a New Caledonian language spoken in the north of the island.

References

New Caledonian languages
Languages of New Caledonia